Tsosib Sumkyil or Churup Sumkhel is the westernmost township of the Zanda County in the Ngari Prefecture, Tibet region of China. It borders India's Spiti region in Himachal Pradesh as well as Rupshu region in Ladakh. The region is watered by the Pare Chu river, a tributary of the Spiti River and an upstream tributary of the Sutlej river. China has ongoing border disputes with India for the southwestern border of the region near Kaurik and the northern border near Chumar.

Name
The township is named after two villages, both of which appear to have two native names.

Tsosib (also spelt Tsosip, Cosib and Cosip) or Churup (also spelt Tsurup) is a border village on the bank of Pare Chu just before the river enters the Indian Spiti district.

The Sumkyil Chu stream flows through a wide enough valley to support several farming villages along its course, including Manja, Tuntun and Azire. The reference to Sumkyil in the name of the township could be also to the entire Sumkyil valley.

The historical name of the region was Tsotso, or Tocho.

Geography
The region of the Tsosib Sumkyil Township is entirely mountainous, with the western parts belonging to the Zanskar Range and the eastern parts belonging to the Ladakh Range. The Pare Chu river flows between the two, entering the region from Rupshu in the north. Several tributaries drain into the river from both the sides, with the Sumkyil Chu being one of the last. The Sumkyil Chu valley is well-populated with several farming villages dotting the valley. After the junction with Sumkyil Chu, the Pare Chu river flows southwest and enters Indian territory between Tsosib and Kaurik.

See also
List of towns and villages in Tibet

Notes

References

Bibliography
 
 

Ngari Prefecture
Populated places in Tibet